The Pratt City Carline Historic District, in Birmingham, Alabama, was listed on the National Register of Historic Places in 1989.

Also known as the Carline District, it developed along a historic streetcar line.  It is roughly along Ave. U from Ave. A to Carline and Carline from Ave. W to 6th St.

It includes 61 contributing buildings, including 37 Commercial brick structures.

References

National Register of Historic Places in Birmingham, Alabama
Historic districts on the National Register of Historic Places in Alabama

Late 19th and Early 20th Century American Movements architecture